Keith Johns (25 February 1902 – 25 March 1979) was an Australian rules footballer who played with Geelong in the Victorian Football League (VFL). He was recruited locally.

A Best and Fairest winner in 1922, Johns was a fullback in Geelong's 1925 premiership win.

References

External links

1902 births
1979 deaths
Geelong Football Club players
Geelong Football Club Premiership players
Carji Greeves Medal winners
Australian rules footballers from Victoria (Australia)
One-time VFL/AFL Premiership players